Moisey Elevich Kirpicznikov  (5 June 1913 - 18 May 1995) was a Soviet botanist.

References

Soviet botanists

1913 births
1995 deaths
Burials at Serafimovskoe Cemetery